Alev Alev may refer to:

 Alev Alev (TV series), a Turkish drama television series
 Alev Alev (film), a 1984 Turkish action film